The Party for Democracy and Rally (PDR) was a political party in Burkina Faso led by Daouda Bayili.

History
The party was formed on 27 August 1993 by Bayili, one of the two MPs for the African Independence Party.

In 1996 it merged into the new Congress for Democracy and Progress.

References

Defunct political parties in Burkina Faso
Political parties established in 1993
1993 establishments in Burkina Faso
Political parties disestablished in 1996
1996 disestablishments in Burkina Faso